Thomas Stirling Lee (London, 16 March 1857 – 29 June 1916, London) was an English sculptor, specialising in reliefs and portrait heads.

Early life 

Lee was born in Lambeth, London on 16 March 1857, the son of John Swanwick Lee, a surveyor. He was educated at Westminster School and then served as an apprentice in the studio of John Birnie Philip.

Lee studied at the Royal Academy Schools from 1876 to 1880, where he won both a Gold Medal and a Travelling Scholarship. In 1880–1881 he studied under Pierre-Jules Cavelier at the École des Beaux-Arts in Paris, and then studied in Rome until 1883.

Career 

Lee's commission for 28 panels for the exterior of St George's Hall, Liverpool, resulting from an open competition held by Liverpool City Council in 1882, is regarded as his most important, but it was the subject of controversy, when the first two featured naked girls, depicting "the child Justice" and "the girl Justice". Lee only completed six of the 28 panels, but was subsequently commissioned to make two, and oversee all, of a further set of six on the theme of 'National Prosperity'.

He was a member of the National Portrait Society from 1910 to 1915, building a studio in Chelsea, London. He was a member and twice chairman of the Chelsea Arts Club and a member of the International Society of Sculptors, Painters and Gravers. Stirling was an active member of the Art Workers' Guild and was elected Master in 1898.

Lee died at St George's Hospital, Knightsbridge, London on 29 June 1916. His friends subscribed to a fund for a bronze panel on the family vault at New Southgate.

Works 

Lee's work includes:

 Bas-reliefs for Leeds Town Hall
 Carvings for Westminster Cathedral
 Bronze statue of Charles Gore, First Bishop of Birmingham, outside Birmingham Cathedral (1914) - 
 The Progress of Justice series of bas reliefs, left of the central portico on Saint George's Hall, Liverpool, 1885–1894
 The National Progress series, right of the portico on Saint George's Hall, 1898–1901
 Doors with scenes of male friendship, Adelphi Bank, Liverpool

References 

1857 births
1916 deaths
20th-century British sculptors
19th-century British sculptors
Alumni of the Royal Academy Schools
British alumni of the École des Beaux-Arts
English male sculptors
People educated at Westminster School, London
People from Lambeth
Sculptors from London